Allam Khodair (born May 15, 1981) is a Brazilian racing driver, currently driving in Stock Car Brasil for Blau Motorsport. His mother is Japanese Brazilian and his father is Lebanese.

Career

Karting
 1999: Khodair wins the Brazilian karting championship; wins the Seletiva de Kart Petrobras race (the 12 best Brazilian drivers); and wins the São Paulo Championship
 1998: Brazilian championship; wins the La Filliere selective race
 1997: He wins the Brazilian championship; the São Paulo Championship; and the Parilla

Between 2000 and 2001, Khodair dedicate to his studies on the University of administration of Companies in FAAP with a dedication in the textile industry.

Formulas
In 2002, he returned to motorsport in the Brazilian Formula Renault 2.0 championship that he won the next season, in 2003. The same year, Khodair ran 2 races in the Formula Renault 2000 UK.In 2004, he joined the Euro Formula 3000. In the four final rounds of the 2006-07 season, Khodair replaced Alexander Khateeb in the A1 Grand Prix series for A1 Team Lebanon. He was allowed to race with the Lebanon team because of his Lebanese descent.

Touring car
Since 2005, he races in the Copa NEXTEL Stock Car with Boettger Competições team since 2006 driving Chevrolet Astra. Since 2007, Khodair has raced for Blau Motorsport.

Career summary

Racing record

Complete Stock Car Brasil results

Complete FIA GT Series results

External links

  Allam Khodair - Boettger Competições at stock2007.com.br
 Driver Statistics at results.a1gp.com
 Career statistics at driverdb.com

References

1981 births
Living people
Brazilian racing drivers
Brazilian Formula Renault 2.0 drivers
British Formula Renault 2.0 drivers
A1 Team Lebanon drivers
Auto GP drivers
Stock Car Brasil drivers
Brazilian people of Japanese descent
Brazilian people of Lebanese descent
Brazilian Buddhists
International GT Open drivers
Sportspeople of Lebanese descent
Manor Motorsport drivers
Racing drivers from São Paulo
A1 Grand Prix drivers
Drivex drivers
Teo Martín Motorsport drivers
Carlin racing drivers